Alpha-globin transcription factor CP2 is a protein that in humans is encoded by the TFCP2 gene.

TFCP2 is also called Late SV40 factor (LSF) and it is induced by well known oncogene AEG-1. LSF also acts as an oncogene in hepatocellular carcinoma. LSF enhances angiogenesis by transcriptionally up-regulating matrix metalloproteinase-9 (MMP9).

Along with its main oncogene function in hepatocellular carcinoma (HCC) it plays multifaceted role in chemoresistance, epithelial-mesenchymal transition (EMT), allergic response, inflammation and Alzheimer's disease. The small molecule FQI1 (factor quinolinone inhibitor 1) prevents LSF from binding to HCC DNA which results in HCC cell death.

Interactions 

TFCP2 has been shown to interact with APBB1 and RNF2.

References

Further reading 

 
 
 
 
 
 
 
 
 
 
 
 
 
 
 
 
 
 

Transcription factors